William Bettenham (fl. 1386–1400) was an English politician. He was the Member of Parliament for Kent in 1386 and 1388.

Bettenham is described as coming "from the least affluent group". He possibly had a background in law.

As some point before June 1389, Bettenham married his wife, Alice. There is little information on him, but he is commonly associated with Stephen Bettenham (d. 1415) of Cranbrook, Kent, who may have been his brother or a close relation. Stephen was a successful lawyer and landowner, and obtained a place on the commission of the peace. William, however, is not thought to have been heavily involved in local politics or to have owned much land. He owned 130 acres of land in Staplehurst; this seems to have come to him through his marriage.

The last record of Bettenham alive is from February 1400.

References

14th-century births
Year of death missing
English MPs 1386
English MPs September 1388
14th-century English politicians
People from Staplehurst